Annacotty railway station, on the Ballybrophy branch, served the village of Annacotty in County Limerick, Ireland.

The station opened on 23 August 1853 and closed on 9 September 1963.

History

Opened as Grange station by the Waterford and Limerick Railway, by the beginning of the 20th century the station was run by the Great Southern and Western Railway. It was absorbed into the Great Southern Railways in 1925.

The station was then nationalised, passing on to the Córas Iompair Éireann as a result of the Transport Act 1944 which took effect from 1 January 1945.
It was closed in 1963.

References

Notes

Sources 
 
 

Disused railway stations in County Limerick
Railway stations opened in 1880
Railway stations closed in 1963